Køge Municipality is a municipality (Danish, kommune) in Region Sjælland on the east coast of the island of Zealand (Sjælland) approx. 40 km southwest of Copenhagen.  The municipality covers an area of 255 km² (98 sq. miles), and has a total population of 61,718 (2022).  Until January 2007, its mayor was Torben Hansen, a member of the Social Democrats (Socialdemokraterne) political party, who died while still in office. He was replaced by Marie Stærke, who at age 27 was Denmark's youngest mayor at that time. 

The main town and the site of its municipal council is the town of Køge. Suburbs inside the urban area of Køge include Køge Nord (Ølby Lyng and Ølsemagle Lyng) to the north and Herfølge to the south. Towns inside the municipality but outside the central urban area include Borup, Ejby, Bjæverskov, Lille Skensved, Lellinge and Algestrup.

As a result of Kommunalreformen ("The Municipal Reform" of 2007), on 1 January 2007, the prior Køge municipality was merged with Skovbo Municipality to form the new Køge municipality.

Urban areas
The ten largest urban areas in the municipality are:

Politics
Køge's municipal council consists of 27 members, elected every four years.

Municipal council
Below are the municipal councils elected since the Municipal Reform of 2007.

Sister cities and towns

References 
 Municipal statistics: NetBorger Kommunefakta, delivered from KMD aka Kommunedata (Municipal Data)
 Municipal mergers and neighbors: Eniro new municipalities map

External links 

 Municipality's official website
 Køge tourist bureau

 
Municipalities of Region Zealand
Municipalities of Denmark
Populated places established in 2007